Egilbert was bishop of Freising in Germany from 1005 to 1035. He was the tutor of Henry, Duke of Bavariathe future Henry III, Holy Roman Emperorbetween 1029 and 1033.

References

Sources

764 deaths
11th-century bishops in Bavaria
Roman Catholic bishops of Freising